The Utah Grizzlies are a professional ice hockey team in the ECHL. They play their home games at the Maverik Center in West Valley City, Utah.

Franchise history 
The current Utah Grizzlies franchise started in 1981 as the Nashville South Stars in Nashville, Tennessee, in the Central Hockey League. Henry Brabham then took over the team in 1983 and relocated them to Vinton, Virginia mid-season, to become the Virginia Lancers. Brabham and the Lancers were then one of the founding members of the East Coast Hockey League (ECHL) in 1988. The franchise was sold and relocated several times until it went dormant after the 2002–03 season. After the American Hockey League (AHL) incarnation of the Grizzlies suspended operations, David Elmore and Donna Tuttle bought the rights to the dormant ECHL franchise and moved the team to the E Center to replace the previous Grizzlies franchise.

Prior to the 2013–14 season, their NHL affiliate Calgary Flames changed their affiliation to the Alaska Aces. Incoming head coach and general manager Tim Branham announced a three-year agreement with the Anaheim Ducks on August 7, 2013. 
After the Grizzlies made the post-season in every season within the Ducks organization, the Grizzlies and Ducks agreed to a multi-year extension during the 2015–16 season.

Following the 2017–18 season, the Grizzlies missed the post-season for the first time in 11 years. At that time, their ECHL rival, the Colorado Eagles, joined the American Hockey League as an affiliate of the Colorado Avalanche after previously serving as the Avalanche affiliate in the ECHL. The Grizzlies ended their agreement with the Ducks and affiliated with the Avalanche, their closest geographical NHL club.

The market was previously served by:
 Utah Grizzlies of the IHL and AHL (1995–2005)

Season-by-season record 
Note: GP = Games played, W = Wins, L = Losses, OTL = Overtime losses, SOL= Shootout losses, Pts = Points, GF = Goals for, GA = Goals against, PIM = Penalty infraction minutes

Players

Current roster
Updated March 19, 2023.

References

External links 

 Official website of the Utah Grizzlies
 Official website of the ECHL

ECHL teams
Ice hockey teams in Utah
Sports in Salt Lake City
Grizzlies
Ice hockey clubs established in 2005
Anaheim Ducks minor league affiliates
Calgary Flames minor league affiliates
Colorado Avalanche minor league affiliates
New York Islanders minor league affiliates
2005 establishments in Utah